James Hastings Allen (1805 - 1880) was an Anglican priest in Ireland in the nineteenth century.

Allen was born in County Clare and educated at Trinity College, Dublin.  He was Dean of Killaloe from 1862 until his death.

Notes

1805 births
1880 deaths
Alumni of Trinity College Dublin
Deans of Killaloe
19th-century Irish Anglican priests
People from County Clare